Oscar Emanuel "Kille" Kjällander (November 8, 1901 – June 11, 1979) was a Swedish boxer who competed in the 1928 Summer Olympics.

In 1928 he was eliminated in the quarter-finals of the middleweight class after losing his fight to the upcoming gold medalist Piero Toscani.

External links
profile

1901 births
1979 deaths
Middleweight boxers
Olympic boxers of Sweden
Boxers at the 1928 Summer Olympics
Swedish male boxers
20th-century Swedish people